The Highland Mountains, highest point Table Mountain, el. ,  are a small mountain range southwest of Whitehall, Montana in Silver Bow and Madison County, Montana.

The Continental Divide winds through the range. A 21,000-acre roadless area encompasses the core of the range, which includes Red Mountain, also over 10,000'. Nutritious alpine forage in the Highlands gives area bighorn sheep the fastest horn growth of any herd in Montana. The green-tinted waters of Emerald Lake provide a nice contrast to the red rock of Red Mountain. A smaller roadless area of about 10,000 acres in the Basin Creek drainage protects Butte's municipal watershed. Lodgepole pine and Douglas-fir are common tree species.

See also
 List of mountain ranges in Montana

Notes

Mountain ranges of Montana
Landforms of Madison County, Montana
Landforms of Silver Bow County, Montana